The Alliance of Hope (abbrev: PH; stylized as HARAPAN) is a Malaysian political coalition consisting of centre-left political parties which was formed in 2015 to succeed the Pakatan Rakyat coalition. It has been the ruling coalition since November 2022 after it formed the coalition government with other political coalitions and parties as a result of the 2022 Malaysian general election, and after it won the 2018 Malaysian general election to February 2020 when it lost power as a result of the 2020 Malaysian political crisis at the federal level for 22 months. The coalition deposed the Barisan Nasional coalition government during the 2018 election, ending its 60-year-long reign (together with its predecessor, Alliance) since independence.

It is currently the largest coalition in the Dewan Rakyat with 82 seats. At the state level, it is the ruling coalition in 7 of the 13 states in the country, Penang, Selangor, Negeri Sembilan, Perak, Pahang, Melaka and Sabah. It also holds two-thirds majorities in the state legislative assemblies of Penang and Selangor, while it rules Perak, Pahang and Melaka in coalition governments with Barisan Nasional (BN) and Sabah with Gabungan Rakyat Sabah (GRS).

The coalition consists of the Democratic Action Party, People's Justice Party, National Trust Party, and United Progressive Kinabalu Organisation. Its main ally is the Malaysian United Democratic Alliance.

The coalition lost its majority in parliament and fell from power in February 2020 when its chairman and then-Prime Minister Mahathir Mohamad resigned after 22 months in office (compared to his 22 years as Prime Minister while with UMNO), and the Malaysian United Indigenous Party together with 11 members of parliament from the People's Justice Party left the coalition.

After the 2022 general election that resulted in a hung parliament, the Alliance of Hope returned to power with a two-thirds majority by forming a coalition government with National Front (BN), Sarawak Parties' Alliance (GPS), Sabah People's Alliance (GRS), Heritage Party (WARISAN), Malaysian People's Party (PBM), Social Democratic Harmony Party (KDM), and independents led by Prime Minister and PH Chairman Anwar Ibrahim. Meanwhile Muhyiddin Yassin's Perikatan Nasional takes the role as the opposition, with 74 seats.

History

Formation 
Pakatan Harapan is a direct successor to the three-party Pakatan Rakyat coalition that consisted of the People's Justice Party, the Democratic Action Party and the Pan-Malaysian Islamic Party. Pakatan Harapan was founded on 22 September 2015, two years after the 2013 general election, due to disagreements and conflicts between PAS and DAP mainly regarding the issue of the implementation of the sharia law, resulting in PAS splitting off from Pakatan Rakyat and the break-up of the coalition on 16 June 2015. The dissolution resulted in the formation of a new coalition named Pakatan Harapan, consisting the former Pakatan Rakyat parties, PKR and DAP, and a PAS split-off party, the National Trust Party.

On 12 November 2016, a United Malays National Organisation split-off party, the Malaysian United Indigenous Party, founded and led by former Malaysian Prime Minister, Mahathir Mohamad, confirmed that the party was committed to joining the opposition bloc Pakatan Harapan. Later, on 13 December, the party formed an electoral pact with Pakatan Harapan, and finally on 14 March 2017, BERSATU officially joined Pakatan Harapan as a member party.

2018 general election 
On 14 July 2017, the Presidential council line-up was confirmed. A common logo was also introduced with the word "Harapan" with the "A" shaped as a chevron in white on a red background. The logo was initially planned to be used by all participating candidates for the 2018 general election, but the use of the logo and registration of the coalition was denied by the Election Commission. To pursue the coalition's plan to contest under a common logo, Pakatan announced that the PKR logo will be used by all component parties of the coalition as its election symbol in the elections, excluding for DAP who chose to contest under their own party flag in Sabah and Sarawak.

The coalition secured an electoral pact with the Sabah-based Sabah Heritage Party for the 2018 general election. WARISAN's president, Shafie Apdal, promised that the party would be represented on the federal cabinet if the coalition came to power, adding that through the electoral pact they will only co-operate with Pakatan as an ally, and not joining the pact as a component party since they will only contest in Sabah, not in Peninsular Malaysia. In that election, Pakatan Harapan swept the election and formed the government in a surprise upset overturning the former ruling party UMNO's decades of uninterrupted rule, as the Malay vote was dissatisfied and mainly went to Amanah and popular former Prime Minister Mahathir Mohamad's party Bersatu, while the Chinese vote was solidly behind parties like DAP and PKR. Following the surprise victory of Pakatan Harapan and WARISAN in the general election, the United Pasokmomogun Kadazandusun Murut Organisation announced that they have left Barisan Nasional and will form a new Sabah state government with WARISAN and Pakatan Harapan. UPKO and WARISAN are currently both the allies for Pakatan Harapan since both parties are also allied towards each other's in Sabah.

At the state level, due to 2018 general election results the coalition formed the government in the states of Kedah, Penang, Perak, Selangor, Malacca, Negeri Sembilan, Johor and Sabah. Pakatan Harapan also forms a government with a two-thirds majority in the states of Penang, Selangor and Johor.

Post-election 

On 16 May 2018, the coalition was officially registered. After winning the power in 2018, the coalition made some efforts in ensuring an independent trial for Najib's corruption charges, an independent anti-corruption commission, and repealing anti-fake news law. On the other hand, other issues such as decentralisation of powers to Sabah and Sarawak, educational reform, issues relating to indigenous people (orang asli), racial equality, and political patronage remained unchanged. Meanwhile, the Pakatan Harapan government was distracted by factional infighting.

On 24 February 2020, Mahathir resigned as the Prime Minister. BERSATU which had 26 MPs, withdrew from the ruling Pakatan Harapan coalition. In addition, 11 MPs from PKR resigned from the party to form an independent bloc. This leaves Pakatan Harapan 37 seats short of the 112 seats needed to form a government. The surprise announcement came amid speculation that Mahathir was attempting to form a new ruling coalition that would exclude his designated successor Anwar Ibrahim. However, Anwar later clarified to reporters that Mahathir did not orchestrate the act. These events also resulted in the number of Pakatan Harapan coalition member parties returned to the original three.

At the state level, Pakatan Harapan lost control of Johor, Malacca, Perak and Kedah. A few PKR, DAP and AMANAH representatives in the state legislative assemblies quit their party and expressed support for the new government Perikatan Nasional in those four states.

Party-to-party relations 
Pakatan Harapan at coalition level doesn't have any allegiance with political internationals. Some of its component parties does, as PKR was recognized as observer party of Liberal International while DAP co-founded the Progressive Alliance. On the aftermath of 15th general election, Anwar Ibrahim received congratulatory message from Ennahda Party of Tunisia. The party previously was present at an event organised by AMANAH in 2015.

Member parties and allied party

Former member party 

 Malaysian United Indigenous Party (BERSATU), (2017–2020)

List of leaders 

Chairman

President

Women Chiefs

Youth Chiefs

Leadership structure

Central Leadership Council 

 Chairman:
 Anwar Ibrahim (PKR)
 President:
 Wan Azizah Wan Ismail (PKR)
 Deputy President:
 Anthony Loke Siew Fook (DAP)
 Mohamad Sabu (AMANAH)
 Ewon Benedick (UPKO)
 Vice-President:
 Chong Chieng Jen (DAP)
 Salahuddin Ayub (AMANAH)
 M. Kulasegaran (DAP)
 Christina Liew (PKR)
 Donald Peter Mojuntin (UPKO)
 Chief Secretary:
 Saifuddin Nasution Ismail (PKR)
 Treasurer:
 Adly Zahari (AMANAH)
 Women Chief:
 Aiman Athirah Sabu (AMANAH)
 Youth Chief:
 Kelvin Yii Lee Wuen (DAP)
 Elections Director:
 Rafizi Ramli (PKR)
 Communications Director:
 Fahmi Fadzil (PKR)
 Strategies Director:
 Salahuddin Ayub (AMANAH)
 Information Chief:
 Teo Nie Ching (DAP)
 Chief Whip:
 Anthony Loke Siew Fook (DAP)
 State Chairman:
 Johor: Salahuddin Ayub (AMANAH)
 Kedah: Mahfuz Omar (AMANAH)
 Kelantan: Muhammad Husin (AMANAH)
 Malacca: Adly Zahari (AMANAH)
 Negeri Sembilan: Aminuddin Harun (PKR)
 Pahang: Amirudin Shari (PKR)
 Perak: Mujahid Yusof Rawa (AMANAH)
 Perlis: Noor Amin Ahmad (PKR)
 Penang: Chow Kon Yeow (DAP)
 Sabah: Christina Liew (PKR)
 Sarawak: Chong Chieng Jen (DAP)
 Selangor: Amirudin Shari (PKR)
 Terengganu: Raja Kamarul Bahrin (AMANAH)
 Federal Territory: Tan Kok Wai (DAP)
 State Deputy Chairperson:
 Johor: 
 Aminolhuda Hassan (AMANAH)
 Liew Chin Tong (DAP)
 Rafizi Ramli (PKR)
 Kedah: 
Nurul Izzah Anwar (PKR)
 Ismail Salleh (AMANAH)
 Tan Kok Yew (DAP)
 Kelantan: 
 Nik Nazmi Nik Ahmad (PKR)
 Azaha Abdul Rani (DAP)
 Malacca: 
 Damian Yeo Shen Li (DAP)
 Aminuddin Harun (PKR)
 Negeri Sembilan: 
 Anthony Loke Siew Fook (DAP)
 Mk Ibrahim Abdul Rahman (AMANAH)
 Pahang: 
  (DAP)
 Zulkifli Mohamed (AMANAH)
 Perak: 
 Nga Kor Ming (DAP)
 Asmuni Awi (AMANAH)
 Chang Lih Kang (PKR)
 Perlis: 
  (AMANAH)
 Teh Seng Chuan (DAP)
 Penang: 
 Nurul Izzah Anwar (PKR)
 Roslan Ahmad (AMANAH)
 Sabah: 
 Poon Ming Fung (DAP)
  (PKR)
 Wilfred Madius Tangau (UPKO)
 Lahirul Latigu (AMANAH)
 Sarawak: 
  (PKR)
 Abang Abd Halil Abang Naili (AMANAH)
 Selangor: 
 Gobind Singh Deo (DAP)
 Izham Hashim (AMANAH)
 Terengganu: 
 Nik Nazmi Nik Ahmad (PKR)
 Ng Chai Hing (DAP)
 Federal Territory: 
 Rafizi Ramli (PKR)
 Mohd Hatta Ramli (AMANAH)

Youth Wing (Angkatan Muda Harapan) 

 Youth Chief:
 Kelvin Yii Lee Wuen
 Deputy Youth Chiefs:
 Hasbie Muda
 Adam Adli
 Nurthaqaffah Nordin
 
 Vice-Youth Chiefs:
 Nik Abdul Razak Nik Md Ridzuan
 Young Syefura Othman
 Muhammad Kamil Abdul Munim
 Kennedy John Angian
Youth Secretary:
 Musaddeq Khalid
Deputy Youth Secretary:
  Omar Mokhtar A Manap
Youth Treasurer:
 Lim Yi Wei
 Deputy Youth Treasurer:
 Nur Najihah Muhaimin
Youth Communications Director:
 Muhammad Haziq Azfar Ishak 
Youth Public Policies Directors:
 Ong Chun Wei
 Nadia Fathin Syahira Ahmad Nazri
 Ammar Atan
Youth Mobilization Directors:
 Umar Khair
 Abbas Azmi
 Jason Raj Kirupanantha
Youth Elections Directors:
 Asmaaliff Abdul Adam
 Prabakaran Parameswaran
 Keristinah Philip Selvaraju

Women's Wing (Wanita Pakatan Harapan) 

 Women's Chief:
 Raj Munni Sabu
 Deputy Women's Chiefs:
 Chong Eng
 Fadhlina Sidek
 
 Vice-Women's Chiefs:
 
 Juwairiya Zulkifli
 Alice Lau Kiong Yieng
 Women's Secretary:
 Teo Nie Ching
 Deputy Women's Secretary:
 Norhayati Bidin
 Women's Treasurer:
 June Leow
 Women's Information Chief:
 Soraya Salim
 Women's Communications Director:
 Yeo Bee Yin
 Women's Elections Director:
 Rozita Abdul
 Women's Training Director:
 Sangetha Jayakumar
 Media and IT Bureau Chief:
 Loh Ker Chean
 Public Policies Chief:
 Kasthuriraani Patto
 Mobilization Chief:
 Anfaal Saari

Elected representatives

Dewan Negara (Senate)

Senators 

 His Majesty's appointee:
 Saifuddin Nasution Ismail (PKR)
 Fuziah Salleh (PKR)
 Saraswathy Kandasami (PKR)
 Roderick Wong Siew Lead	(DAP)
 Hasbie Muda (AMANAH)
 Mohd Hatta Ramli (AMANAH)
 Manolan Mohamad (PKR)
 Abun Sui Anyit (PKR)
 Noorita Sual (DAP)
 Negeri Sembilan State Legislative Assembly:
 Kesavadas A. Achyuthan Nair (DAP)
 Ahmad Azam Hamzah (PKR)
 Penang State Legislative Assembly:
 Lingeshwaran R. Arunasalam (DAP)
 Amir Md Ghazali (PKR)

Dewan Rakyat (House of Representatives)

Members of Parliament of the 15th Malaysian Parliament 

Pakatan Harapan has 82 members in the House of Representatives (with allied parties).

Dewan Undangan Negeri (State Legislative Assembly) 

Penang State Legislative Assembly
Selangor State Legislative Assembly
Negeri Sembilan State Legislative Assembly
Perak State Legislative Assembly

Kedah State Legislative Assembly
Johor State Legislative Assembly
Pahang State Legislative Assembly
Malacca State Legislative Assembly

Sabah State Legislative Assembly
Perlis State Legislative Assembly
Sarawak State Legislative Assembly

Terengganu State Legislative Assembly
Kelantan State Legislative Assembly

Pakatan Harapan state governments 

Pakatan Harapan also forms the state governments of Pahang, Perak and Melaka in coalition with Barisan Nasional, and the state government of Sabah in coalition with Gabungan Rakyat Sabah, following the formation of the federal unity government (Kerajaan Perpaduan) in the aftermath of the 15th general election of November 2022.

Ministerial posts

General election results

State election results

See also
 Politics of Malaysia
 List of political parties in Malaysia

Notes

References 

Political party alliances in Malaysia
2015 establishments in Malaysia
Political parties established in 2015